Vorobyovo is a rural locality (a village) and the administrative center of Vorobyovskoye Rural Settlement, Sokolsky District, Vologda Oblast, Russia. The population was 673 as of 2002. There are 4 streets.

Geography 
Vorobyovo is located 67 km northeast of Sokol (the district's administrative centre) by road. Lubodino is the nearest rural locality.

References 

Rural localities in Sokolsky District, Vologda Oblast